Rolando Giono (born March 8, 1987) is a Panamanian professional boxer.  

Giono lost to Emanuel Lopez for the WBA interim lightweight title.

He also lost to Jackson Marinez for the WBA Fedelatin lightweight.

References

External links

1987 births
Living people
Panamanian male boxers
Featherweight boxers
Super-featherweight boxers
Lightweight boxers
21st-century Panamanian people